Steven Liu Chia-chang (born 13 April 1940 or 13 April 1943) is a former songwriter, singer, screenwriter, director and actor from the Republic of China (Taiwan).

Background

Discography
Liu wrote songs such as "Ode to the Republic of China" and "The Plum Blossom", and collaborated with famous singers such as Fei Yu-ching and Teresa Teng.

Filmography
Liu wrote and directed Feng shui er shi nian (1983), a Hong Kong-Taiwanese film alternately titled in English, The Lost Generation, and titled worldwide in English, Women in Love.

Personal life
Liu married actress Chiang Ching in 1966 and later had a son Liu Ji-chen, who would later be renamed to Liu Ji-peng. Liu and Chiang divorced in 1970.

In 1978, Liu married Zhen Zhen, an actress and former wife of Patrick Tse, they later had a son Jeremy Liu on 21 April 1986, who would later become a singer. Liu and Zhen Zhen divorced in 1987 soon after.

References

External links
 
 

Living people
Taiwanese male singers
Taiwanese songwriters
Taiwanese screenwriters
Taiwanese film directors
Taiwanese people from Heilongjiang
Year of birth missing (living people)